Chakpath is a place in Doru Shahabad tehsil in Anantnag district in the Indian union territory of Jammu and Kashmir. It is one of 62 villages in Doru Shahabad Block along with villages like Shangrin and Shankerpora.it is one of the famous village around doru shahbad it has a big garden having four chinars  it is near the garden kulamchinar it is one of the famous garden around the valley. Chakpath has an important place in the history of Kashmir. It is said that while on his way to different endeavours the famous ruler Yousuf Shah Chek used to rest under the chinars along with his baes.

Demographics
Kashmiri is the Local Language here. Also
People Speak Kashmiri and Urdu. Pin Code of Chakpath is 192210 which comes under srinagar postal division (Jammu kashmir Circle)

References

Villages in Anantnag district